Miguel is an Israeli drama television series that was first broadcast in Israel on Hot 3 in January 2018. The series was created by Tom Salama and Daphna Levine and stars Ran Danker as a gay man that adopts a child from Guatemala. The story is loosely based on Salama's own experiences, as he travelled to Central America when he was younger to adopt a child.

Synopsis
Tom, a gay man is determined to become a father and achieve his dream of adopting a child. He travels to Guatemala where he adopts a 5-year-old boy, Miguel and returns with the boy to Israel. Miguel is stubborn to accept his new life and sixteen years later returns to Guatemala in search of his biological mother. Tom, however is determined to shield Miguel from a secret he has been hiding since the adoption.

Cast
 Ran Danker as Tom, the adopted parent of the titular character
 Raúl Méndez as Martin, coordinator of Guatemala's adoption office
 Aviv Karmi as Amira, Tom's friend that accompanies him to Guatemala
 Omer Ben David as Miguel, Tom's grown-up adopted son
 Miguelito Sojuel as young Miguel, the child that Tom adopts
 Adam Karst as Zohar

Reception
Miguel won the special performance prize for best ensemble cast at Canneseries. The Financial Times praised the performance of Miguelito Sojuel playing the younger titular character: "Sojuel is outstanding as an orphan who stubbornly refuses to embrace the new life his adoptive father has planned out for him. Clutching a football as if his life depended on it, he dominates the screen with his defiant eyes: proud of who he is and steadfastly unmoved by gift-wrapped blandishments."

In Israel the series was positively reviewed by Walla!, describing it as a "strong" series that "pushes all the right buttons." The news outlet continued to praise the performances of the cast and concluded that it is "a touching glimpse of a rough and sensitive human story, full of beautiful moments."

References

External links
 

2018 Israeli television series debuts
Gay-related television shows
Israeli drama television series
Israeli LGBT-related television shows
Television series about orphans
2010s LGBT-related drama television series